Niederwerth is a municipality in the district of Mayen-Koblenz in Rhineland-Palatinate, western Germany. It is situated on two islands (one of which, Graswerth, is an uninhabited nature reserve) in the Rhine, opposite the town Vallendar.

References

Islands of the Rhine
River islands of Germany
Mayen-Koblenz
Landforms of Rhineland-Palatinate